In geometry, the truncated dodecadodecahedron (or stellatruncated dodecadodecahedron) is a nonconvex uniform polyhedron, indexed as U59. It is given a Schläfli symbol t0,1,2{,5}. It has 54 faces (30 squares, 12 decagons, and 12 decagrams), 180 edges, and 120 vertices. The central region of the polyhedron is connected to the exterior via 20 small triangular holes.

The name truncated dodecadodecahedron is somewhat misleading: truncation of the  dodecadodecahedron would produce rectangular faces rather than squares, and the pentagram faces of the dodecadodecahedron would turn into truncated pentagrams rather than decagrams. For this reason, it is also known as the quasitruncated dodecadodecahedron. Coxeter et al. credit its discovery to a paper published in 1881 by Austrian mathematician Johann Pitsch.

Cartesian coordinates 
Cartesian coordinates for the vertices of a truncated dodecadodecahedron are all the triples of numbers obtained by circular shifts and sign changes from the following points (where  is the golden ratio):

Each of these five points has eight possible sign patterns and three possible circular shifts, giving a total of 120 different points.

As a Cayley graph
The truncated dodecadodecahedron forms a Cayley graph for the symmetric group on five elements, as generated by two group members: one that swaps the first two elements of a five-tuple, and one that performs a circular shift operation on the last four elements. That is, the 120 vertices of the polyhedron may be placed in one-to-one correspondence with the 5! permutations on five elements, in such a way that the three neighbors of each vertex are the three permutations formed from it by swapping the first two elements or circularly shifting (in either direction) the last four elements.

Related polyhedra

Medial disdyakis triacontahedron

The medial disdyakis triacontahedron is a nonconvex isohedral polyhedron. It is the dual of the uniform truncated dodecadodecahedron.

See also 
 List of uniform polyhedra

References

External links 
 
 

Uniform polyhedra